"Creeping Death" is a song by American heavy metal band Metallica. It was released on November 23, 1984, as the lead and only commercial single from their album Ride the Lightning ("Fade to Black" and "For Whom the Bell Tolls", from the same album, were issued as promotional singles). Written from the perspective of the Angel of Death, "Creeping Death" describes the tenth plague of Egypt. It is often thought of as one of the band’s most popular songs and is currently the second most played song live by them.

Development
Kirk Hammett wrote the guitar riff for the bridge section when he was 16 years old. The middle section, with its ominous chants of "Die!" set to a Phrygian mode chord progression, was originally written by Hammett while he was in Exodus. The song was called "Die by His Hand" and had been part of the Exodus setlist for live shows, but was never used on any Exodus albums.

Metallica was inspired for the song by the second half of the film The Ten Commandments, which is based on the Bible tale of the Plagues of Egypt. While watching the scene of the final plague killing every Egyptian first-born child, Cliff Burton remarked "Whoa – it's like creeping death", as the plague was represented by a fog rolling into the Pharaoh's palace. The band liked the sound of "creeping death" and decided to write a song about the plagues, with the phrase as its title.

The single release's artwork was done by Alvin Petty. The logo and the song's title were added with a plastic layover to the existing artwork. Kirk Hammett had seen the picture hanging up at Petty's house and remarked that it would be perfect for the single and picture-disk that were about to be finished.

Lyrics

The song is told from the perspective of the "Destroyer", the Angel of Death sent by God during the Tenth Plague of Egypt. Moses, through his older brother Aaron, insisted he was sent by God and repeatedly demanded that Pharaoh should set the Hebrew slaves free from Egypt to the promised land of Canaan. For the previous 400 years, the Hebrew people had lived as slaves in the Land of Goshen within Egypt. To punish Pharaoh for his obstinacy, God set ten plagues upon Egypt. The references to the plagues in the song include:

Release
The single was released through Music for Nations in the UK and France. The B-sides were the cover songs "Am I Evil?" (originally by Diamond Head) and "Blitzkrieg" (originally by Blitzkrieg). These covers are called Garage Days Revisited on the back cover; the 1987 EP The $5.98 E.P. - Garage Days Re-Revisited is a reference to this title. The B-sides were later included on the compilation album Garage Inc..

Reception
It is ranked at #1 on Guitar World 10 greatest Metallica songs of all time. It was also voted by Rolling Stone readers in 2014 as the sixth greatest Metallica song in the poll "The 10 Best Metallica Songs".

Track listing

Personnel
James Hetfield – rhythm guitar, lead vocals
Kirk Hammett – lead guitar
Cliff Burton – bass guitar, backing vocals
Lars Ulrich – drums

Cover versions
Stone Sour - Meanwhile in Burbank....

Bullet For My Valentine - Scream Aim Fire.

Apocalyptica - Plays Metallica by Four Cellos

Drowning Pool - Ozzfest 2002

References

1984 singles
Metallica songs
Passover songs
Songs written by Cliff Burton
Songs written by James Hetfield
Songs written by Kirk Hammett
Songs written by Lars Ulrich
Book of Exodus
1984 songs
Megaforce Records singles